Sodo Stadium or  Wolaita Sodo Studium is an Ethiopian multi-use stadium located in Wolaita, Southern Ethiopia. It is primarily utilized for sporting events and acts as Wolaita Dicha  and Wolaita Sodo City F.C.'s home stadium. In addition to hosting sport competition the stadium also used for organizing different mass conferences and holydays like Gifaata. Wolaita Sodo Stadium can accommodate the maximum capacity for spectators watching a football match is 30,000.

References 

Multi-purpose stadiums in Ethiopia
Football venues in Ethiopia
Wolayita